The CCHA Best Offensive Defenseman was an annual award given out at the conclusion of the Central Collegiate Hockey Association (CCHA) regular season to the best offensive defenseman in the conference as voted by the coaches of each CCHA team.

The Best Offensive Defenseman was first awarded in 1990 and every year thereafter until 2013 when the original CCHA was dissolved as a consequence of the Big Ten Conference forming its men's ice hockey conference.

The CCHA was revived in 2020, with play resuming in the 2021–22 season, by seven schools that left the Western Collegiate Hockey Association, with an eighth school joining before play started. The revived league chose to fold its previous awards for Best Offensive and Best Defensive Defenseman into a single CCHA Defenseman of the Year award.

Four players received the award two separate times, each doing so in consecutive years. Additionally, Andy Greene is the only defenseman to win both the 'Best Offensive' and 'Best Defensive' Defenseman in the same year (2005–06).

Award winners

Winners by school

See also
CCHA Awards
CCHA Best Defensive Defenseman

References

General

Specific

External links
CCHA Awards (Incomplete) 

College ice hockey trophies and awards in the United States